"Out of All Them Bright Stars" is a science fiction short story by Nancy Kress. It was first published in The Magazine of Fantasy and Science Fiction, in 1985.

Synopsis
Sally Gourley is a waitress at a diner who watches as an alien tries to order a meal, only to have events spin out of control.

Reception

"Out of All Them Bright Stars" won the 1986 Nebula Award for Best Short Story. Kress has observed that Gourley is "powerless because of her class, not her gender."

References

External links

Nebula Award for Best Short Story-winning works
Works originally published in The Magazine of Fantasy & Science Fiction